Bolesław Barbacki  (10 October 1891 – 21 August 1941) was a Polish painter.

In World War II he was arrested by the Gestapo and shot.

20th-century Polish painters
20th-century Polish male artists
1891 births
1941 deaths
Polish male painters